Raphaël Garcia (born 6 May 1999) is a Canadian soccer player who last played for Valour FC in the Canadian Premier League as a right-back.

Club career

Early career
Garcia started playing soccer at the age of 4 in his backyard with his dad. By the age of 6, Garcia started playing competitively with the Gloucester Hornets. After playing many years in Ottawa, Garcia decided to attend the open trials of the Montreal Impact Academy and made the team alongside Canadian International Ballou Tabla. 

At 13 years of age, Garcia left his family to be the first ever Gloucester Hornets player to join the Montreal Impact Academy. During his time in the academy of Major League Soccer side Montreal Impact, Garcia made 79 appearances in USSDA, scoring 11 goals.

On 7 September 2018, Garcia played in the Cap City Cup with USL Championship side Ottawa Fury in a 1–0 loss to Montreal Impact.

Valour FC
On 10 January 2019, Garcia signed a multi-year deal as his first professional contract with Canadian Premier League side Valour FC. He made his senior debut on 11 May 2019 as a starter in a 1–0 win over HFX Wanderers FC.

International career
Garcia was 14 years old when he made his debut in the Canadian youth program in November 2013 as part of an U15 identification camp in Vaughan.

References

External links

1999 births
Living people
Association football defenders
Canadian people of Spanish descent
Canadian soccer players
Soccer players from Ottawa
Valour FC players
Canadian Premier League players